Joey, also known as Making Contact, is a 1985 West German  techno-horror-fantasy film from Centropolis Film Productions (now Centropolis Entertainment). The film was co-written and directed by Roland Emmerich.

Plot 
The plot concerns a 9-year-old boy named Joey Collins (Joshua Morell) who loses his father, but makes contact with what he believes is his deceased parent via a small phone and is terrorized by a ventriloquist dummy named Fletcher who is possessed by a demon. The doll summons other demons and evil forces to threaten his friends, mother, enemies, city as only Joey must go into the spirit world to destroy this evil in a battle of good vs. evil. The boy develops the power of telekinesis, which soon gets out of hand.

Cast 

 Joshua Morrell as Joey Collins
 Eva Kryll as Laura Collins
 Jan Zierold as Martin
 Tammy Shields as Sally
 Barbara Klein as Dr. Haiden
 Matthias Kraus as Bernie
 Jack Angel as Fletcher the Dummy (voice)

Release
Joey was released in North America as Making Contact. The North American version was heavily cut and ran 79 minutes. Joey was subsequently released as a 2 disc DVD set featuring the original 98 minute version along with the edited North American cut. In 2016, Kino Lorber has announced a Blu-ray with a new high definition transfer and newly produced special features.

Making Contact was riffed for the 2022 Mystery Science Theater 3000 LIVE: Time Bubble Tour.

References

External links
 
 
 

1985 films
1980s science fiction horror films
1985 horror films
1985 fantasy films
Puppet films
German fantasy films
German horror films
German science fiction films
Demons in film
Science fantasy films
1980s supernatural horror films
West German films
English-language German films
1980s German-language films
Films directed by Roland Emmerich
New World Pictures films
Films set in the United States
German children's fantasy films
1980s German films